Kifah Al-Mutawa (born 28 October 1962) is a Kuwaiti épée and foil fencer. He competed at the 1980 and 1984 Summer Olympics.

References

External links
 

1962 births
Living people
Kuwaiti male épée fencers
Olympic fencers of Kuwait
Fencers at the 1980 Summer Olympics
Fencers at the 1984 Summer Olympics
Kuwaiti male foil fencers